Jason Owen (born circa 1994) is an Australian singer from Dubbo, New South Wales and was the runner-up to Samantha Jade on the fourth season of The X Factor Australia in 2012 and subsequently received a recording contract with Sony Music Australia.

Career

2012–2013: The X Factor and Sony Music Australia
In 2012, Owen auditioned for season four of The X Factor Australia, eventually placing second. 

Owen released his debut single "Make It Last", which would have been his winner's single if he had won The X Factor, on 23 November 2012. The single peaked at number 47 on the ARIA Singles Chart. Owen's debut studio album Life Is a Highway was released on 26 April 2013, and debuted at number five on the ARIA Albums Chart and was the thirtieth highest selling album by an Australian artist in 2013.

2014–present: Proud and John Denver albums
Owen left Sony Music Australia and signed with Social Family Records in June 2014. His second album Friday Night was released on 6 March 2015, and debuted at number nine on the ARIA Albums Chart. It was the 53rd highest selling country album in Australia in 2015. 

His third album Proud was released on 6 May 2016. It is his first album of original material. 

Owen's fourth album Jason Owen Sings John Denver was released in 2017 to mark 20 years since Denver's passing.

In August 2018, Owen wrote and recorded the song "These Are the Times", with funds raised going towards drought relief.

Discography

Albums

Singles

Awards
 2014 Nomination: CMAA 'Highest Selling Country Album of the Year'

References

Sony BMG artists
21st-century Australian singers
The X Factor (Australian TV series) contestants
Australian country singers
Australian pop singers
Year of birth uncertain
1990s births
Living people